The Vladar Company is a film production and distribution company, led by Vlad Yudin and Edwin Mejia. Founded in 2008, the company has focused on content creation to cater to market's growing need for multi-cultural and inspirational entertainment content across multiple platforms. The company focuses on developing, financing and packaging films with its producing partners at leading Hollywood and International production studios.

Production company
Vladar's film production remains the largest division of The Vladar Company. They have produced four feature films since 2008 and have multiple projects currently in production. Their most recent release, Generation Iron, opened with a weekend box office total of $245,000, making it the biggest documentary opening of 2013. It opened to positive reviews, currently holding an 80% on review aggregator Rotten Tomatoes.

Film releases

Upcoming productions

Distribution company
Vladar Vision is a division of The Vladar Company, focusing on acquiring and releasing multi-platform content to mainstream multi-cultural audiences through various mediums including Home Video, Digital, VOD, Cable Television and selective Theatrical.

Recent partnership with media giant American Media Inc, has broadened global appeal for Vladar's content. Vladar Vision has licensed a pipeline of feature films for worldwide distribution and has partnerships in place with major streaming video on demand service company's.

Vladar Vision

Generation Iron Fitness Network
Generation Iron FItness Network was launched after the success of the film.  It provides editorial content and entertainment for all things bodybuilding and fitness. Launched in July, 2014, the fitness network offers a variety of article topics such as workout routines, motivational pieces, nutrition diets, videos and exclusive news.

Mr. Olympia 2014
The Vladar Company produced the Mr. Olympia competition for its 50th anniversary. The program was broadcast in two 90 minute specials in October 2014 by NBC Sports Group. Vlad Yudin directed the production. The program marks the first time Mr. Olympia has been televised since 1984.

Publishing
The Vladar company is an active publisher of comics and graphic novels. Vladar has made appearances at many national and local comic con conventions throughout 2013 and 2014.

Head Smash
Head Smash is a graphic novel by writer Vlad Yudin, artist Tim Bradstreet, and colorist Dwayne Harris. It was published on July 31, 2013, through The Vladar Company. The story follows a superhero character in a pre-apocalyptic city. The producers of The Twilight Saga are set to co-produce the film adaptation.

References

External links
 
 

Companies based in Los Angeles County, California
Mass media companies established in 2008
Film production companies of the United States
Film distributors of the United States